Romans 10 is the tenth chapter of the Epistle to the Romans in the New Testament of the Christian Bible. It is authored by Paul the Apostle, while he was in Corinth in the mid-50s AD, with the help of an amanuensis (secretary), Tertius, who adds his own greeting in Romans 16:22. Paul continues his discussion of Israel's rejection of God's purpose which he had commenced in chapter 9: despite his "anguish over Israel" it remains his "heart's desire and prayer to God for the Israelites that they may be saved".

Text
The original text was written in Koine Greek. This chapter is divided into 21 verses.

Old Testament references
Romans 10:5 references Leviticus 18:5
 Romans 10:6 references Deuteronomy 30:12
 Romans 10:7 references Deuteronomy 30:13
Romans 10:8 references Deuteronomy 30:14
 Romans 10:11 references Isaiah 28:16
 Romans 10:13 references Joel 2:32
 Romans 10:15 references Isaiah 52:7 and Nahum 1:15
 Romans 10:16 references Isaiah 53:1
 Romans 10:18 references Psalm 19:4
 Romans 10:19 references Deuteronomy 32:21
 Romans 10:20 references Isaiah 65:1
 Romans 10:21 references Isaiah 65:2

Zeal for God not based on knowledge
Paul asserts that those Jews who have not believed in Jesus Christ are "zealous for God", but their zeal is not based on knowledge (Romans 10:2); or, in the International Children's Bible, "They really try to follow God. But they do not know the right way."

Righteousness according to Moses

Verse 5

The quotation in Romans 10:5 is from Leviticus 18:5.

Verse 8

The quotation in Romans 10:8 is from Deuteronomy 30:14.

Verse 9

The Lord Jesus": rendered in NET as "Jesus is Lord" or "the Lord."

Verse 13

The quotation in Romans 10:13 is from Joel 2:32. "The Lord", which originally refers to 'Yahweh', is assigned to Jesus in verse 9.

Hearing and obeying the gospel
Using a series of prophetic quotations from Moses, Isaiah and Joel, Paul argues that faith comes through hearing and the gospel must be preached if it is to be heard and obeyed, but also that it was indeed made known to the people of Israel, who have refused to believe, and their disobedience and stubbornness was itself foretold in prophecy (Romans 10:14–21).

Verse 15

Romans 10:15 cites Isaiah 52:7.

Uses

Music
The King James Version of verses 15 and 18 from this chapter is cited as texts in the English-language oratorio "Messiah" by George Frideric Handel (HWV 56).

See also 
 Christ
 Israel
 Isaiah
 Jesus
 Moses
 Related Bible parts: Leviticus 18, Deuteronomy 30, Deuteronomy 32, Psalm 19, Isaiah 28, Isaiah 52, Isaiah 53, Isaiah 65, Joel 2, Nahum 1

References

Bibliography

External links
 King James Bible - Wikisource
English Translation with Parallel Latin Vulgate
Online Bible at GospelHall.org (ESV, KJV, Darby, American Standard Version, Bible in Basic English)
Multiple bible versions at Bible Gateway (NKJV, NIV, NRSV etc.)

10